Laxmi Kanta Das (born 1 July 1938) is an Indian weightlifter. He competed at the 1960 Summer Olympics and the 1964 Summer Olympics.

References

External links
 

1938 births
Living people
Indian male weightlifters
Olympic weightlifters of India
Weightlifters at the 1960 Summer Olympics
Weightlifters at the 1964 Summer Olympics
Sportspeople from Kolkata